The Man Who Found Himself is a 1925 American silent drama film directed by Alfred E. Green and written by Thomas J. Geraghty based upon a story by Booth Tarkington. The film stars Thomas Meighan, Virginia Valli, Frank Morgan, Ralph Morgan, Charles A. Stevenson, and Julia Hoyt. The film was released on August 23, 1925, by Paramount Pictures.

Plot summary

Cast

Preservation
With no prints of The Man Who Found Himself located in any film archives, it is a lost film.

References

External links

 
 
 
 

1925 films
1920s English-language films
Silent American drama films
1925 drama films
Paramount Pictures films
Films directed by Alfred E. Green
American black-and-white films
American silent feature films
Lost American films
1925 lost films
Lost drama films
1920s American films